Higher is the Grammy winning  eleventh studio album by Canadian singer Michael Bublé, released on March 25, 2022, by Reprise Records. The album won Best Traditional Pop Album at the 2023 Grammy Awards in Los Angeles.  The album includes arrangements of Paul McCartney's ballad "My Valentine", produced by McCartney himself, and Sam Cooke's "Bring It On Home to Me" as well as a collaboration with Willie Nelson on a cover of Nelson's "Crazy".

Critical reception

Matt Collar from AllMusic gave the album four out of five stars, saying: "His relaxed, kitten-soft voice is a perfect match for the nuanced and sophisticated style of these songs." Markos Papadatos from Digital Journal gave the album five out of five stars, calling it "one of the most captivating albums of his career"  Mike Wass from Variety wrote that Bublé "gets to show the full breadth of his talent, while staying true to idols, influences, and, most importantly, himself."

Track listing

Commercial performance
Higher debuted at number one on UK Albums Chart, becoming Bublé's fifth album to reach the top spot in the country. In Australia, Higher debuted at number two on ARIA Top Albums Chart, becoming his ninth album to reach the second spot. The album also proved to be a success around the world, reaching number one in Scotland and top 10 peaks in New Zealand (No. 2), Ireland (No. 4), the Flanders region of Belgium (No. 8) and Switzerland (No. 9).

Charts

References

2022 albums
Michael Bublé albums
Reprise Records albums
Albums produced by David Foster
Albums produced by Greg Wells
Albums produced by Paul McCartney
Grammy Award for Best Traditional Pop Vocal Album
Juno Award for Adult Contemporary Album of the Year albums